Erreway: 4 caminos is an Argentine film of 2004, an alternative universe of the Argentine soap opera Rebelde Way.

Plot 
The film is an alternative universe with the characters of the television series ; In Erreway: 4 caminos, Mía and Marizza don't share the same birthday, Mía and Manuel are not supported by their parents, Mía and Marizza are not step-sisters, Mía is not obsessed with fashion, and Marizza and Pablo never dated.  The movie follows the group on an roadtrip around Argentina for a tour. The group had to go through beautiful moments, such as the discovery of the fact that Mia is pregnant with Manuel's baby, who will turn out to be a girl, who they will called : Candela. But they also will have to go through very difficult times, like the late discovery of Mia's leukemia. However, Rebelde Way will become famous and will live again through Candela, who, as an adult woman, will become a famous and appreciated singer, who sings the songs of Rebelde Way, in honor of the group and in honor to her mother.

Cast

External links
 

2004 films
2000s adventure films
2000s teen drama films
Argentine romantic comedy-drama films
2000s Spanish-language films
2000s musical films
2000s road movies
Films based on television series
2004 romantic comedy-drama films
2000s Argentine films